Riley Stillman (born March 9, 1998) is a Canadian professional ice hockey defenceman for the  Buffalo Sabres of the National Hockey League (NHL). He was selected by the Florida Panthers in the fourth round, 114th overall, of the 2016 NHL Entry Draft.

Playing career

Junior
Stillman played bantam and midget hockey within the Peterborough Petes organization before playing in the Ontario Junior Hockey League with the Cobourg Cougars in the 2014–15 season. He was selected prior to the season 63rd overall in the 2013 OHL Priority Selection by the Oshawa Generals. Stillman joined the Generals through the end season from the Cougars, featuring in 9 games.

Following a promising rookie campaign on the blueline, posting 21 points in 62 games with the Generals, in the 2015–16 season, Stillman was selected in the 2016 NHL Entry Draft by the Florida Panthers, 114th overall.

During his final junior season in 2017–18, Stillman was traded by the Generals to contending club, the Hamilton Bulldogs in exchange for future draft picks on December 28, 2017.

On March 5, 2018, Stillman was signed to a three-year, entry-level contract with the Florida Panthers. He established new career highs with a combined 29 assists and 34 points, in helping the Bulldogs claim the J. Ross Robertson Cup.

Professional
After attending the Panthers 2018 training camp, Stillman was assigned to begin his professional career with AHL affiliate, the Springfield Thunderbirds, for the 2018–19 season. Exhibiting a responsible two-way game with the Thunderbirds, Stillman posted 11 points through 46 games before he received his first recall to the Panthers on February 26, 2019. 
He made his debut that night for the Panthers in a 4–3 overtime defeat to the Arizona Coyotes at Gila River Arena in Glendale, Arizona. In playing for the Panthers, Stillman joined his father in becoming the first father and son to have played with the franchise.

During the 2020–21 season, on April 8, 2021, Stillman was traded by the Panthers alongside Brett Connolly, the rights to Henrik Borgström and a 2021 seventh-round draft pick to the Chicago Blackhawks in exchange for Lucas Carlsson and Lucas Wallmark.

On April 25, 2021, Stillman signed a three-year, $4.05 million contract extension with the Blackhawks.

Approaching the 2022–23 season, Stillman was traded by the Blackhawks to the Vancouver Canucks in exchange for Jason Dickinson and a second-round pick in the 2024 NHL Entry Draft on October 7, 2022. Stillman limited through injury, appeared in 35 games with the Canucks and registered 5 assists. Nearing the NHL trade deadline, the Canucks dealt Stillman to the Buffalo Sabres in exchange for prospect Josh Bloom on February 27, 2023.

Personal life
Stillman was born in Calgary when his father, Cory was a member of the Calgary Flames. He grew up in Peterborough, Ontario once his father's career ended. His brother, Chase, plays in the Ontario Hockey League (OHL) with the Peterborough Petes.

Career statistics

Awards and honours

References

External links
 

1998 births
Living people
Buffalo Sabres players
Canadian expatriate ice hockey players in the United States
Canadian ice hockey defencemen
Chicago Blackhawks players
Florida Panthers draft picks
Florida Panthers players
Hamilton Bulldogs (OHL) players
Ice hockey people from Calgary
Ice hockey people from Ontario
Oshawa Generals players
Sportspeople from Peterborough, Ontario
Springfield Thunderbirds players
Syracuse Crunch players
Vancouver Canucks players